The Anti-Tank Mine General Service Mark II was a British anti-tank blast mine used during the Second World War. The mine is fitted with a thin brass cover, which acts as a pressure plate. The cover is suspended over the main body of the main by four leaf springs. A Sorbo ring (Sorbo rubber sponge) can be fitted between the cover and the mine body, which absorbs shock and blast and allows the mines to be planted as close as  without causing sympathetic detonation (normally five feet is the minimum safe distance).

Sufficient pressure on the cover of the mine causes the cover to press downward onto the pressure cap of the fuze. This downward pressure forces the assembly surrounding the striker down until the striker retaining balls are aligned with a cavity. The balls are pushed aside and the striker is released impacting the detonator which detonates the C.E. pellet, triggering the exploder and then the main charge.

The mines main charge was relatively small and the mine appears to have been withdrawn by the end of the war, being replaced by the larger Mk 5 mine. The mine was used in large numbers at the 1942 Second Battle of El Alamein.

Specifications
 Diameter: 
 Height:  with cover
 Weight: 8.5 lb (3.9 kg)
 Operating force: 350 lbf (1.56 kN)
 Explosive content: 4 lb of TNT (1.8 kg) or Baratol

References

 Anti-tank mines, Military Training Pamphlet No. 40 (1942), The War Office.
 NAVORD OP 1665, British Explosive Ordnance, Naval Ordnance Systems Command (Updated 1970)

Anti-tank mines of the United Kingdom
World War II weapons of the United Kingdom